Paul Laband (24 May 1838 – 23 March 1918) was a German jurist and the German Empire's leading scholar of constitutional law.

Life and work
Labant was born into a Jewish family and converted to Christianity in 1857. He studied law at Breslau, Heidelberg and Berlin, and obtained his habilitation in Heidelberg in 1861. He was called to teach at Königsberg in 1864, and at Strasbourg in 1872, where he taught until his retirement. The Imperial government appointed him as councillor of state of Alsace-Lorraine in 1879 and as a member of that state's legislature in 1911. He was a signatory of the Manifesto of the Ninety-Three that supported Germany's entry into World War I.

Laband's writings on constitutional law are characterized by a formalist approach focused on terminology and logic, disregarding other rules of statutory interpretation such as historical, philosophical, political or teleological considerations. In a 1870 paper on Prussian budget law, he established the distinction made in German legal scholarship between laws in the formal sense and laws in the material sense. Laband was also influential as the editor of several leading law reviews and as the author of the textbook Staatsrecht des deutschen Reiches, which appeared in five editions until 1914.

Works
 Beiträge zur Kunde des Schwabenspiegels. Berlin 1861
 Das Magdeburg-Breslauer systematische Schöffenrecht. Berlin 1863
 Jura Prutenorum. Königsberg 1866
 Magdeburger Rechtsquellen. Königsberg 1869
 Die vermögensrechtlichen Klagen nach den sächsischen Rechtsquellen des Mittelalters. Königsberg 1869
 Das Budgetrecht nach den Bestimmungen der preußischen Verfassungsurkunde. Berlin 1871
 Das Finanzrecht des Deutschen Reichs. In: Hirths: Annalen. 1873
 Das Staatsrecht des Deutschen Reichs. 3 volumes. Laupp, Tübingen 1876–1882
 Die Wandlungen der deutschen Reichsverfassung. Dresden 1895 (digitized)
 Der Streit über die Thronfolge im Fürstentum Lippe. Berlin 1896 (digitized)
 Staatsrechtliche Vorlesungen. Vorlesungen zur Geschichte des Staatsdenkens, zur Staatstheorie und Verfassungsgeschichte und zum deutschen Staatsrecht des 19. Jahrhunderts, gehalten an der Kaiser-Wilhelm-Universität Straßburg 1872–1918. Ed. by Bernd Schlüter. Duncker & Humblot, Berlin 2004, .

Further reading
 
 
 Reinhard Mußgnug: Paul Laband (1838-1918). In: Peter Häberle, Michael Kilian, Heinrich Amadeus Wolff (Hrsg.): Staatsrechtslehrer des 20. Jahrhunderts. De Gruyter, Berlin 2014, S. 3–28, doi:10.1515/9783110303780.3.
 Bernhard Schlink: Laband als Politiker. In: Der Staat 31 (1992), S. 553–569.
 Bernd Schlüter: Reichswissenschaft: Staatsrechtslehre, Staatstheorie und Wissenschaftspolitik im Deutschen Kaiserreich am Beispiel der Reichsuniversität Straßburg. Dissertation. Klostermann, Frankfurt am Main 2004, .
 Johannes Wilhelm: Die Lehre von Staat und Gesetz bei Paul Laband. Diss., Köln 1967.

References 

German jurists
1838 births
1918 deaths
Academic staff of the University of Strasbourg
German scholars of constitutional law